Homer Steinweiss is an American drummer, songwriter, and producer known as a prominent drummer in the New York soul revival scene. He is a founding member and drummer of groups including Sharon Jones & The Dap-Kings, Lee Fields & The Expressions, El Michels Affair, and Dan Auerbach's The Arcs, among many others. He leads the Brooklyn folk soul band Holy Hive with Paul Spring. A popular session musician as part of The Dap-Kings and in his own right, he is perhaps best known for his work with Mark Ronson and Amy Winehouse, with whom he recorded the 2006 album Back to Black.

Early life
Steinweiss was born into a musical family in New York City. His parents worked in the jewelry business and were very supportive of his interest in music. He began playing music in the early 1990s after watching a conga player in the jazz band at his sister's Manhattan high school. When his conga teacher became unavailable he switched to drums. Steinweiss was initially interested in grunge but an early drum teacher, Matt Patuto, guided him to the music of James Brown and The Meters.

In 2001, Steinweiss entered college at SUNY Purchase to study philosophy, though he already had an active musical career.

Career
Steinweiss' career took off when he was only 16 after The Mighty Imperials released their first record, Thunder Chicken. The Mighty Imperials included Steinweiss on drums, bassist Nick Movshon, multi-instrumentalist Leon Michels (later founder of Truth and Soul Records), and singer Joseph Henry.

The Mighty Imperials' raw funk and soul sounds morphed into many collaborations including Sharon Jones & The Dap-Kings, El Michels Affair, Fabulous Three, Menahan Street Band and The Arcs and others. In 2006, British producer Mark Ronson heard Sharon Jones & The Dap-Kings and asked the band to play a session with the then-unknown Amy Winehouse.  These sessions became her album Back to Black.

Steinweiss has recorded and toured with artists such as Amy Winehouse, The Arcs, St. Vincent, Foreigner, The Kills, Bruno Mars, Lady Gaga, Sheryl Crow and others.

Personal life
Steinweiss is an illustrator and dog lover, a foodie and occasionally blogs about the food he finds.

Discography
Adapted from Allmusic.

As band member 
With The Mighty Imperials

 Thunder Chicken (2001)

With Sharon Jones & the Dap-Kings

 Dap Dippin' with Sharon Jones and the Dap-Kings (2002)
 Naturally (2005)
100 Days, 100 Nights (2007)
I Learned the Hard Way (2010)
Give the People What They Want (2014)
It's a Holiday Soul Party (2015)
Soul of a Woman (2017)

With Lee Field & The Expressions

 Problems (2002)
My World (2009)
 Faithful Man (2012)
 Emma Jean (2014)
 Special Night (2016)
 It Rains Love (2019)
 Big Crown Vaults Vol. 1 (2020)

With El Michels Affair

 Sounding Out The City (2005)
The PJs... From Afar (with Raekwon) (2006)
 Walk On By (A Tribute To Isaac Hayes) EP (2009)
 Enter The 37th Chamber (2010)
 Loose Change EP (2014)
 Return To The 37th Chamber (2016)
 Adult Themes (2020)
Clover (Original Motion Picture Soundtrack) (as The Diamond Mine)
 Yeti Season (2021)

With Menahan Street Band

 Make the Road by Walking (2008)
 The Crossing (2012)
No Time For Dreaming (2011) (with Charles Bradley)
 Victim of Love (2013) (with Charles Bradley)
 Changes (2016) (with Charles Bradley)
 Black Velvet (2018) (with Charles Bradley)
The Exciting Sounds of Menahan Street Band (2021)

With The Fabulous Three

 The Best Of The Fabulous Three (2014)

With The Arcs

 Yours, Dreamily, (2015)
 The Arcs vs. The Inventors Vol. I EP (2015)

With The Olympians

 The Olympians (2016)
With Holy Hive

Day Break (2017)
 Harping EP (2017)
Float Back To You (2019)

As producer 

 The Like – Release Me (2010) (additional producer, 3 tracks) (produced by Mark Ronson)
 Diane Birch – Speak a Little Louder (2013)
 Paul Spring – Towards a Center (2015) 
Monika – Secret in the Dark (2015)
 Mail The Horse -– Planet Gates (2015)
 Max Shrager – Thoughts Of You (2016)
 Erika Spring – Scars (2018)
 Doug Shorts – Casual Encounter EP (2019) (produced with Frank Dukes)

As sideman 

 Amy Winehouse – Back to Black (2006) (produced by Mark Ronson)
Mark Ronson – Version (2007) (produced by Mark Ronson)
Naomi Shelton & the Gospel Queens – What Have You Done, My Brother? (2009)
Daniel Merriweather – Love & War (2009)
Aloe Blacc – Good Things (2010)
Mark Ronson – Record Collection (2010) (produced by Mark Ronson)
 Michael Leonhart & the Avramina 7 – Seahorse and the Storyteller (2010)
Rufus Wainwright – Out of the Game (2012) (produced by Mark Ronson)
 Saun & Starr –  Look Closer (2015)
Texas – Texas 25  (2015)
Geoff Zanelli & Mark Ronson – Mortdecai (Music From The Motion Picture) (2015)
 The Frightnrs – "Gonna Make Time" from Nothing More to Say (2016)
 Lady Wray – Queen Alone (2016)
 Como Mamas – Move Upstairs (2017)
 The Sha La Das – Love In The Wind (2018) (as the Menahan Street Band)
 Grace Lightman – Silver Eater (2019)
 Hanni El Khatib – Flight (2020)
 Michael Leonhart & JSWISS – Bona Fide (2022)

Credits

Drumming credits 
Credits as a session musician.

As sampled artist 
The earthy, retro grooves of the Menahan Street Band have been sampled by many artists including Jay Z and Kendrick Lamar. El Michels Affair grooves have been sampled by many artists as well including Wu-Tang Clan, Raekwon, Isaac Hayes and many others. Credits include,

 Eminem – "Groundhog Day" from The Marshall Mathers LP 2 (2013)
 Ludacris – "Not Long" from  Ludaversal (2015)
 Travis Scott – "Antidote" from Rodeo  (2015)

References

Living people
Record producers from New York (state)
American funk drummers
Musicians from Brooklyn
American session musicians
Daptone Records artists
1982 births
21st-century American drummers
The Arcs members
Sharon Jones & The Dap-Kings members